Chamolaelaps is a genus of mites in the family Laelapidae.

Species
 Chamolaelaps hypudaei (Oudemans, 1902)

References

Laelapidae